Cristian Pasquato (born 20 July 1989) is an Italian footballer who plays as a midfielder for  club Trento.

Club career

Early career 
Born in Padua, Pasquato began his career in the youth ranks of Padova at age six. After just one season with his hometown club, however, he joined the youth setup of Montebelluna, where he ultimately would remain until 2003, when he was scouted out by Juventus officials.

Juventus 
Pasquato officially joined Juventus in July 2003 and instantly earned early comparisons to club legend Alessandro Del Piero, most notably due to their origins at Padova, but also due their similar field positions and free-kick abilities. In 2006, Pasquato reached the Primavera team after winning the Allievi title. Being a free kick specialist, Pasquato scored the winner against Internazionale in the Supercoppa Primavera final. After six years in the Juventus youth sector, Pasquato began to earn senior call-ups from coach Claudio Ranieri during the 2007–08 Serie A season, and made his first team debut on 11 May 2008, the final matchday of that season, as a second-half substitute. Following the Primavera final, Pasquato was promoted to the first team.

Pasquato continued with the Juventus first team during the 2008–09 pre-season and impressed throughout the summer. He also competed with the team in the UEFA Champions League.

Loan Deals 
On 24 August 2008, it was confirmed that Pasquato had signed for Serie B side Empoli on a one-year loan deal. With the Tuscan club, Pasquato made 23 league appearances and scored one goal in his first full season in the professional leagues. On 1 July 2009, he returned to Juventus, though his loan with Empoli would be extended for one more season soon after. During the andata of the 2009–10 Serie B campaign, Pasquato managed just nine league appearances, scoring one goal.

Because of his lack of match time, Juventus recalled the young forward back to Turin during the 2010 January transfer window before ultimately re-loaning the player back to the second division with Triestina. During his loan with the club from Trieste, Pasquato made 16 league appearances and scored one goal. His efforts were not enough to save the club from relegation to the Lega Pro Prima Divisione at the end of the season.

After returning to Juventus on 30 June 2010 following the expiration of his six-month loan deal with Triestina, Pasquato was again loaned out, this time to Modena, another Serie B club. He spent the entire 2010–11 season at Modena, scoring nine goals and notching 13 assists in 40 league games for the club. After the highly productive season with the gialloblu, Pasquato returned to Juve once more, and after training with the first team for the entire pre-season and competing in several summer tournaments and friendly matches, it was believed that the youngster would remain in Turin under new coach Antonio Conte. On 26 July 2011, Pasquato notably scored the winning goal for Juventus in a 1–0 win over América in the 2011 World Football Challenge. Pasquato began the match as a starter on the left-wing of Conte's 4–2–4, and scored a brilliant volley past Armando Navarrete after 42 minutes of play. The match was held in New York at CitiField.

On 31 August 2011, Pasquato was once again sent out on loan by Juventus: he was loaned to fellow Serie A club Lecce – along with teammate Manuel Giandonato – on a season-long loan. He was, however, recalled from his loan period at Lecce on 27 January 2012 due to limited play time. He was loaned out to city-rivals Torino in the Serie B just two days later, on 29 January 2012.

Udinese 
On 30 June 2012, Pasquato returned to Juventus, although the club sold half of his registration rights to Udinese for €1.5 million as part of a deal that also saw Kwadwo Asamoah and Mauricio Isla move from Udinese to Juventus, also in co-ownership deals.

Loan to Bologna 
Pasquato was then immediately sent on loan by Udinese to Bologna on a season-long loan deal, where he teamed up with former Juve teammates Marco Motta, Michele Pazienza and Frederik Sørensen. On 26 August he made his debut in Serie A, as a substitute replacing Robert Acquafresca in the 88th minute of a 2–0 away defeat against ChievoVerona. On 28 November he scored his first goal for Bologna, in the fourth round of Coppa Italia, in the 35th minute of a 1–0 home win over Livorno. On 29 December, Pasquato scored his second goal, in the round of 16 of Coppa Italia, in the 38th minute of a 2–1 away win over Napoli. On 15 January 2013, Pasquato played in the quarter-finals of Coppa Italia, he was replaced by Manolo Gabbiadini in the 55th minute of a 3–2 away defeat against Inter.  On 27 January he scored his first Serie A goal for Bologna, as a substitute, in the 54th minute of a 3–3 home draw against Roma. On 3 March he scored his second goal in Serie A, again as a substitute in the 92nd minute of a 3–0 home win over Cagliari. Pasquato ended his loan to Bologna with 18 appearences, 4 goals and 1 assist.

On 17 June 2013, Udinese and Juventus renewed the co-ownership agreement of the player, with Udinese continuing to hold onto his registration rights.

Loan to Padova 
On 8 August 2013, Udinese loaned Pasquato to Serie B club Padova. On 11 August he made his debut for Padova, in the second round of Coppa Italia, as a substitute replacing Andrea Raimondi in the 66th minute and he scored his first goal for Padova in the 83rd minute of a 2–1 home win over Virtus Entella. On 17 August, Pasquato played in the third round of Coppa Italia, he was replaced by Davide Voltan in the 55th minute of a 1–0 away defeat against Trapani. On 24 August he made his Serie B debut for Padova, he was replaced by Andrea Raimondi in the 72nd minute of a 2–0 home defeat against Trapani. On 8 September, Pasquato played his first full match for Padova, a 3–0 home defeat against Palermo. On 21 September, Pasquato scored his first goal in Serie B for Padova in the 14th minute of a 3–1 away defeat against Empoli. On 4 October he scored his second goal in 61st minute of a 3–2 home win over Varese. On 19 October, Pasquato scored his third goal in the 89th minute of a 2–1 home win over Juve Stabia. Pasquato ended his season-long loan to Padova with 39 appearences, 8 goals and 5 assists.

Return to Juventus 
On 20 June 2014, Juventus confirmed the outright purchase of Pasquato from Udinese on a three-year contract for €1.5 million fee.

Loan to Pescara 
On 1 September 2014, Pasquato was signed by Pescara. On 7 September, Pasquato made his debut in Serie B for Pescara in a match against Ternana, he scored his first goal for Pescara in the 55th minute and he was replaced by Roberto Guana in the 70th minute of a 1–1 away draw. On 4 October, Pasquato scored his second goal, as a substitute in the 82nd minute of a 4–0 home win over Virtus Entella. On 12 October he scored his third goal in the 42nd minute of a 4–1 away win over Crotone. On 2 December he played, as a substitute, in the fourth round of Coppa Italia, he replaced Birkir Bjarnason in the 83rd minute of a 1-0 away defeat against Sassuolo. On 17 January 2015, Pasquato scored 2 goals in a 4–2 away win over Trapani. On 24 January he played his first full match for Pescara, a 2–1 home defeat against Ternana. On 12 February he was sent off with a double yellow card in the 42nd minute of a 1–0 home win over Catania. Pasquato ended his season-long loan to Pescara with 38 appearences, 7 goals and 7 assists.

Loan to Livorno and Pescara 
On 31 August 2015, Pasquato was signed by Livorno on a 6-month loan deal. On 6 September he made his debut for Livorno in Serie B, he was replaced by Riccardo Cazzola in 61st minute of a 4–0 home win over Pescara. On 21 September he played his first full match for Livorno, a 3–2 away win over Ternana, in this match he scored his first goal for Livorno in the 86th minute. On 26 September, Pasquato scored his second goal for Livorno, as a substitute, in the 72nd minute of a 2–1 home defeat against Spezia. On 24 October he scored twice in a 2–0 home win over Modena. Pasquato finished his loan to Livorno with 19 appearences, 4 goals and 2 assists.

On 1 February 2016, Pasquato returned to Pescara on a 6-month loan deal. On 6 February he made his debut for Pescara as a substitute replacing Ahmed Benali in the 67th minute of a 2–2 away draw against Salernitana. On 19 April, Pasquato played his first full match for Pescara in this season, a 1–0 away win over Spezia. On 1 June he scored his first goal for Pescara in this season in the 34th minute of a 4–2 home win over Novara. Pasquato ended his loan to Pescara with 15 appearences and 1 goal.

Loan to Krylia Sovetov 
On 10 August 2016, Pasquato joined Russian Premier League club Krylia Sovetov on a season-long loan. He also added one more year to his current contract with Juventus (to 2018). On 26 August he made his debut for Krylia Sovetov as a substitute replacing Sergey Tkachev the 79th minute of a 1–0 home defeat against Ufa. On 22 September he played in the round of 32 of Russian Cup in a 2–0 away win over Shinnik. On 26 September, Pasquato played his first full match, in Premier League, for Krylia Sovetov, a 0–0 away draw against Amkar Perm. On 27 October, Pasquato played, as a substitute, in the round of 16 of Russian Cup in a 3–1 home defeat against Lokomotiv Moscow. On 20 November, Pasquato scored his first goal for Krylia Sovetov in the 4th minute of a 3–1 away defeat against Zenit. On 1 December he scored his second goal in the 59th minute of a 4–0 home win over Spartak Moscow. On 15 April 2017 he scored his third goal in the 64th minute of a 3–1 away win over Anzhi Makhachkala. Pasquato ended his loan to Krylia Sovetov with 28 appearances, 5 goals and 8 assists.

Legia Warsaw 
On 19 July 2017, Pasquato joined Polish Ekstraklasa side Legia Warsaw. On 22 July he made his debut in Ekstraklasa for Legia Warsaw as a substitute replacing Sebastian Szymanski in the 57th minute of a 1–1 home draw against Korona Kielce. On 25 October he scored his first goal for Legia Warsaw in the 29th minute of a 3–1 away win over Bytovia Bytow in the first leg of quarter-finals of the Polish Cup.

Campodarsego 
On 2 July 2019, Pasquato began a free agent when his contract with Legia Warsaw expired. On 21 October 2019, Pasquato joined Campodarsego, a team competing in Serie D - Girone C, the fourth tier of Italian football.

Gubbio
On 21 August 2020 he signed with Serie C club Gubbio.

Trento
On 8 September 2021, he joined Trento as a free agent.

International career 
Pasquato has represented Italy at every youth level, from under-15 to under-21. On 25 March 2009, he made his debut with the Italy U-21 squad in a friendly match against Austria.

Style of play 
A versatile player, Pasquato is capable of playing in several attacking and offensive midfield roles. He has been deployed as a second striker, in the centre as an attacking midfielder, and as a left winger, a position which enables him to take on opponents in one on one situations, cut into the middle, and strike on goal with his stronger right foot. A quick, diminutive, creative, and agile player, with good technique, dribbling skills, vision, and a slender build, as well as an ability to create chances for teammates, he was regarded as a promising talent in his youth. He is also considered to be a set-piece specialist, and is known for his bending shots and free kicks.

Career statistics

Club

Honours

Club 
Juventus Primavera
 Supercoppa Primavera: 2007
 Champions Youth Cup: 2007 (runner-up)
 Allievi Nazionali Youth League: 2005–06

Legia Warsaw
 Polish Cup: 2018
 Ekstraklasa: 2017–18

International 
Italy U–17
 U–17 Pepsi International Tournament: 2005

References

External links 
 
 

1989 births
Living people
Sportspeople from Padua
Italian footballers
Association football forwards
Serie A players
Serie B players
Serie C players
Serie D players
Juventus F.C. players
Empoli F.C. players
U.S. Triestina Calcio 1918 players
Modena F.C. players
U.S. Lecce players
Torino F.C. players
Udinese Calcio players
Bologna F.C. 1909 players
Calcio Padova players
Delfino Pescara 1936 players
U.S. Livorno 1915 players
A.S. Gubbio 1910 players
A.C. Trento 1921 players
Russian Premier League players
PFC Krylia Sovetov Samara players
Ekstraklasa players
Legia Warsaw players
Italian expatriate footballers
Expatriate footballers in Russia
Italian expatriate sportspeople in Russia
Expatriate footballers in Poland
Italian expatriate sportspeople in Poland
Italy under-21 international footballers
Footballers from Veneto